Sócrates Quintana Montoto (18 December 1891 – 28 February 1984), was a Spanish artist and footballer who played as a midfielder for RS Gimnástica and Athletic Club de Madrid. He was one of the most important footballers in the amateur beginnings of RS Gimnástica, being one of the main architects of the team's football power in Madrid, competing head-to-head against the likes of Madrid FC and Racing de Madrid. In addition to being an artist and footballer, he also practiced athletics, a specialty in which he came to hold the national record of 110 meters hurdles.

Early life
Born in a small town in Asturias, he grew up there until the age of 8, when in 1900, he moved with his family to Madrid, the city in which he began to play football and his artistic training. In 1905 he was forced to abandon his studies for family reasons and began to work as a temporary worker in the General Directorate of Debt and Passive Classes in the Spanish finances, an institution in which he will continue working until his retirement, without ever abandoning artistic and sporting activity.

Club career
He began his career with RS Gimnástica in 1910, with whom he played for 4 seasons, featuring alongside José Carruana and the Uribarri brothers (Eulogio and Ricardo). He played a pivotal role in the club's two Centro Championship titles between 1909 and 1911, plus a third one in 1913–14. He also helped his side to reach the 1912 Copa del Rey Final, which ended in a 0–2 loss to FC Barcelona.

In 1915, he joined Athletic Club de Madrid, forming a great midfield partnership with Miguel Mieg and featuring alongside the likes of Pagaza and the Villaverde brothers (Fernando and Senén). He retired in 1918.

International career
Like many other Athletic Madrid players of that time, he was summoned to play several matches for the Madrid national team during the 1910s, however, due to the little statistical rigor that the newspapers had at that time, the exact amount of caps he earned is unknown. He is one of the few players to have represented Madrid in the four initial editions of the Prince of Asturias Cup between 1915 and 1918, an inter-regional competition organized by the RFEF, finishing as runner-up in 1916 and winning in 1917 and 1918, although he never came off the bench on the latter. In the 1917 edition, he formed a great partnership with the team's captain José María Castell and fellow Athletic teammate Miguel Mieg in the midfield, which was a fundamental piece to claim the Prince of Asturias Cup trophy for the first time in the capital side's history.

Artistic career
In 1919, he applied to the Board for the Expansion of Scientific Studies and Research for a pension that would allow him to improve his training and travel abroad, which was granted to him in 1921, allowing him to travel for a year in France, Great Britain, Germany and Italy. On his return to Spain, he focuses on poster design, painting and xylography, a technique he had learned during his stay in London, and he also begins to collaborate as an illustrator in the Revista de Occidente. He came to illustrate hundreds of books throughout his life, most using photogravure and lithography techniques. He spent the years of the Civil War separated from his family and due to his work in the Ministry of Finance of the Government of the Republic, he was transferred to Valencia, Tarragona and Barcelona.

In subsequent decades, he presented his works in a large number of exhibitions, both individual and collective, achieving critical acclaim. A recognition that translates into numerous awards, among which the Drawing Prize of the National Painting Contest and several awards at the National Exhibition of Fine Arts stand out.

Quintana died on 28 February 1984 in Madrid at the age of 93. His last exhibition was held just a few days before his death, in his hometown of Mieres. Many of his paintings are preserved in Spanish museums and in the Ateneo de Madrid.

Honours

Club
RS Gimnástica
Centro Championship:
Champions (3): 1909–10, 1910–11 and 1913–14

Copa del Rey:
Runner-up (1): 1912

International
Madrid
Prince of Asturias Cup:
Champions (1): 1917
Runner-up (1): 1916

References

1891 births
1984 deaths
People from Mieres, Asturias
Footballers from Asturias
Footballers from Madrid
Spanish footballers
Association football midfielders
Atlético Madrid footballers
Spanish male hurdlers
Spanish artists